Palimmecomyia is a genus of horse flies in the family Tabanidae.

Species
Palimmecomyia pictipennis (Mackerras, 1960)
Palimmecomyia walkeri (Newman, 1857)

References

Tabanidae
Brachycera genera
Diptera of Australasia